The 1992 Toyota Atlantic Championship season was contested over 14 rounds. The SCCA Toyota Atlantic Championship Drivers' Champion was Chris Smith.

Races

Final driver standings (Top 12)

See also
1992 IndyCar season
1992 Indy Lights season

External links
ChampCarStats.com

Atlantic Championship 1992
Atlantic Championship 1992
Atlantic Championship seasons